Barbara J Hounsell (born 6 July 1951) is a female Canadian former swimmer. Hounsell competed in two events at the 1964 Summer Olympics. Despite being of Canadian nationality she won the 440 yards medley title in 1965 at the ASA National British Championships.

References

External links
 

1951 births
Living people
Canadian female swimmers
Olympic swimmers of Canada
Swimmers at the 1964 Summer Olympics
Place of birth missing (living people)
Canadian female medley swimmers
20th-century Canadian women
21st-century Canadian women